Shiv Thakare (born 9 September 1989) is an Indian television personality known for participating in reality shows like MTV Roadies Rising and Bigg Boss Marathi 2 and Bigg Boss 16.

Early life and family 
Thakare was born as Shiv Manoharrao Uttamrao Jhinguji Ganuji Thakare on 9 September 1989 in Amravati, Maharashtra. At an early age, he began supporting his father Manohar Thakare who worked at a betel leaf shop. He later sold milk packets and newspapers to support his family.

He dated Veena Jagtap, a fellow contestant in his season of Bigg Boss Marathi. During the show, Thakare permanently tattooed Veena's name on his right hand, as a part of a task. They split in 2022.

Career 
Thakare is best known for his role as a reality television personality. His journey began with the reality show MTV Roadies Rising in 2017, in which he reached the semi-finals. Subsequently, he appeared in MTV's The Anti Social Network. In 2019, He participated in the Marathi reality-program Bigg Boss Marathi 2 and ended up winning the show  In 2020, he joined the panel of MTV Roadies Revolution as a judge in the audition rounds.

In March 2021, he launched his entrepreneurial project, a deodorant brand called "B.Real".

From October 2022 to February 2023, he was seen participating in Colors TV's reality show Bigg Boss 16, where he finished as the 1st runner-up.

Media image 
He was ranked twenty-first in The Times of India's Top 30 Most Desirable Men of Maharashtra in 2019. He was ranked First in The Times of India's Top 15 Most Desirable Men on Marathi Television in 2019.

Filmography

Television

Special appearances

Music video

Awards

References

External links 

 
 Shiv Thakare on Instagram

Reality show winners
Living people
Bigg Boss Marathi contestants
Big Brother (franchise) winners
Participants in Indian reality television series
MTV Roadies contestants
1989 births